Jean-Pierre Mahé (21 March 1944, Paris) is a French orientalist, philologist and historian of Caucasus, and a specialist of Armenian studies.

Bibliography 
1978: Hermès en Haute-Égypte, t. 1 : Les textes hermétiques de Nag Hammadi et leurs parallèles grecs et latins (Bibliothèque copte de Nag Hammadi, textes 3), Québec (PUL), 171 p. in 8°
1982: Hermès en Haute-Égypte, t. 2 : Le fragment du Discours parfait et les Définitions hermétiques arméniennes (Bibliothèque copte de Nag Hammadi, textes 7), Québec-Louvain (PUL, Peeters), L + 565 p. in 8°
1985: Le livre arménien à travers les âges, with Raymond Haroutioun Kevorkian, Catalogue de l'Exposition Marseille 1985 : Le livre arménien à travers les âges.
1986: Catalogue des « incunables » arméniens, 1511-1695 ou Chronique de l'imprimerie arménienne, with Raymond Haroutioun Kevorkian, P. Cramer, Geneva.
1988: Arménie : 3000 ans d'histoire, avec Raymond Haroutioun Kevorkian, Maison arménienne de la jeunesse et de la culture.
1992: Cave of Treasures (introduction, traduction du géorgien et notes), CSCO 527, Louvain (Peeters), XL + 120 p. in 8°
1993: La sagesse de Balahvar, une vie christianisée du Bouddha (introduction, translation from Georgian and notes ; with A. Mahé), Paris (Gallimard, Connaissance de l’Orient 60), 156 p. in 16°
1993: Moïse de Khorène, Histoire de l’Arménie (introduction, translation from Armenian and notes ; with A. Mahé), Paris (Gallimard, L’Aube des peuples), 455 p. in 8°
1993: Histoire du Christianisme, T. IV, Évêques, moines et empereurs, Desclée de Brouwer
1996: Le Témoignage véritable (introduction, texte copte, translation and notes ; with A. Mahé), Bibliothèque copte de Nag Hammadi, textes 23, Québec-Louvain (Peeters), XVIII + 250 p. in 8°
1997: Des Parthes au Califat : quatre leçons sur la formation de l'identité arménienne, with Nina G. Garsoyan, De Boccard.
1997: From Byzantium to Iran. Armenian Studies in Honour of Nina G. Garsoïan (with R.W. Thomson), Atlanta (Scholars Press), 523 p. in 8°
1999: The Way of Hermes (with C. Salaman et D. van Oyen), London (Duckworth) ; 4th paperback edition in the U.S, Rochester, Vermont, 2004, 124 p. in 16°
2000: Grégoire de Narek, Tragédie (introduction, translation from Arménien and notes, with A. Mahé), CSCO 584, Louvain (Peeters), 838 p. in 8°
2001: Le nouveau manuscrit sinaïtique N Sin 50 (facsimile and introduction by Z. Aleksidzé ; French translation and complementary notes by J.-P. Mahé), CSCO 586, Louvain (Peeters), 286 p. in 8°
2001: Melchisédek (introduction and translation by J.-P. Mahé ; Coptic text established by W.P. Funk ; commentary by Cl. Gianotto), Bibliothèque copte de Nag Hammadi, textes 28, Québec-Louvain (Peeters), XX + 190 p. in 8°
2004: Grégoire de Narek et le Livre de lamentation (with A. Mahé), Erévan (éditions Naïri), VIII + 326 p. in 16° (in Armenian)
2004: Et l'Arménie devint chrétienne, with Jean-Varoujean Gureghian, Éditions de Paris
2004: Le Livre des Canons arméniens (Kanonagirk' Hayoc). Église, Droit et Société en Arménie du IVe au VIIIe, with Aram Mardirossian, Peeters.
2005: L’Arménie à l’épreuve des siècles (with A. Mahé), Paris (Gallimard, Découvertes Gallimard/Histoire 464), 160 p. in 16°
2006: Saint Grégoire de Narek, théologien et mystique (with B.L. Zekiyan), Actes du colloque international, 20–22 January 2005 (ACO 275), Rome (Pontificio Istituto Orientale), 390 p. in 8°
2007: Paroles à Dieu de Grégoire de Narek (introduction, translation and commentary ; with A. Mahé), Paris (Peeters, La Procure), 486 p. in 16°
2007: Écrits gnostiques. La Bibliothèque de Nag Hammadi, under the direction of J.-P. Mahé and P.-H. Poirier, Paris (Gallimard, La Pléiade), LXXXVII + 1830 p. in 16°
2012: Histoire de l'Arménie (with Annie Mahé), Paris (Perrin, Pour l'Histoire), 745 p.
2014: Trésor des fêtes. Hymnes et odes de Grégoire de Narek (introduction, translation and notes, with Annie Mahé), Paris (Peeters), 295 p.

See also 
 History of Armenia

References

External links 
 Notice on the site of the Académie des Inscriptions et Belles-Lettres
 Jean-Pierre MAHÉ on Monde Byzantin 
 Couleur du sang et de la vendange dans l’hymnographie arménienne, par Jean-Pierre Mahé

20th-century French historians
21st-century French historians
Historians of Gnosticism
French philologists
French translators
Translators to French
Translators from Armenian
Armenian studies scholars
Academic staff of the École pratique des hautes études
Academic staff of the University of Strasbourg
Academic staff of Université Laval
Harvard University faculty
Members of the Académie des Inscriptions et Belles-Lettres
Members of the Société Asiatique
Fellows of the British Academy
Chevaliers of the Légion d'honneur
Commandeurs of the Ordre des Palmes Académiques
Knights of St. Gregory the Great
1944 births
Scientists from Paris
Living people
Corresponding Fellows of the British Academy